This list of the prehistoric life of Maine contains the various prehistoric life-forms whose fossilized remains have been reported from within the US state of Maine.

Precambrian
The Paleobiology Database records no known occurrences of Precambrian fossils in Maine.

Paleozoic
 †Amphistrophonella
 †Amphistrophonella funiculata – or unidentified comparable form
  †Ampyx
 †Annamitella – tentative report
 †Annamitella borealis
 †Apiculiretusispora
  †Atrypa
 †Atrypa reticularis
 †Barinophyton
 †Barinophyton richardsoni
 †Barrandeina
 †Barrandeina aroostookensis
 †Batostoma
 †Batostomella
 †Bucania – or unidentified comparable form
 †Cardiola
 †Cardiola gibbosa
 †Cartericardia – tentative report
 †Cartericardia dubia – type locality for species
 †Clivosisporites – or unidentified comparable form
 †Clivosisporites verrucata
 †Crossoceras
 †Crossoceras belandi
 †Cyrtia
 †Daidia
 †Daidia wilsonae
 †Dalejina
 †Dalmanella
 †Dalmanella testudinaria
 †Decorochilina
 †Decorochilina beushauseni
 †Delerorthis
 †Delerorthis flabellites
 †Delthyris
 †Deltoidospora
 †Dolerorthis
  †Drepanophycus
 †Eccentricosta
 †Emphanisporites
 †Emphanisporites annulatus
 †Emphanisporites rotatus
 †Eocoelia
 †Eodinobolus
 †Eodinobolus rotundus
 †Eohostimella – type locality for genus
 †Eohostimella heathana – type locality for species
 †Eoplectodona – tentative report
 †Famatinorthis
 †Famatinorthis turneri – or unidentified comparable form
 †Ferganella
  †Geragnostus
 †Goniostropha
 †Goniostropha chapmani
 †Grandispora
 †Gypidula
 †Hibbertia – tentative report
 †Hostimella
 †Hystricoceras
 †Hystricoceras hitchcocki
  †Illaenus
 †Kaulangiophyton
 †Kaulangiophyton akantha
 †Kolihadiscus
 †Kolihadiscus somerseti – type locality for species
 †Leptaena
 †Leptaena rhomboidalis
 †Lesueurilla – tentative report
 †Lophospira
 †Lophospira milleri – or unidentified comparable form
 †Mesoleptostrophia
 †Michelia
 †Michelia compacta – or unidentified comparable form
 †Michelia planogyrata – or unidentified comparable form
 †Michelia tenue – type locality for species
  †Monograptus
 †Monograptus bohemicus
 †Monograptus chimaera
 †Monograptus colonus
 †Monograptus crinitus
 †Monograptus dubius
 †Monograptus forbesi
 †Monograptus nilssoni
 †Monograptus scanicus
 †Monograptus tumescens
 †Monograptus varians
 †Monograptus vicinus – or unidentified comparable form
 †Neumanella
 †Nicholsonella
 †Nileus
 †Nucleospira
 †Nylanderina – type locality for genus
 †Nylanderina goldringae – type locality for species
 †Orthambonites
 †Orthambonites robusta
 †Orthonychia
 †Orthonychia aroostooki – type locality for species
 †Orthonychia compressa – type locality for species
 †Paleocyclus – tentative report
 †Paralenorthis
 †Paralenorthis robustus
 †Paraliospira
 †Paraliospira angulata – or unidentified related form
 †Patellostium
 †Patellostium revolvens – type locality for species
  †Pentamerus – tentative report
  †Pertica – type locality for genus
 †Pertica quadrifaria – type locality for species
 †Platyceras
 †Platyceras chapmani – type locality for species
 †Platyceras edmundi – type locality for species
 †Platyceras hebes
 †Platyceras ventricosum
  †Platystrophia
 †Platytoechia
 †Platytoechia boucoti
 †Plectodonta
 †Plectonotus
 †Plectonotus trilobatus
 †Polytoechia – tentative report
 †Pragozyga
 †Pragozyga jerseyense – type locality for species
 †Productorthis
 †Productorthis mainensis
  †Prototaxites
 †Psilophyton
 †Psilophyton dapsile – type locality for species
 †Psilophyton forbesii – type locality for species
 †Psilophyton microspinosum – type locality for species
 †Psilophyton princeps
 †Raymondaspis
 †Resserella
 †Sawdonia
 †Sawdonia ornata
 †Sphaerochitina
 †Streptotrochus – tentative report
 †Streptotrochus deciduus – type locality for species
 †Stricklandialens
 †Stricklandialens ultima – or unidentified comparable form
 †Strophonella
 †Strophonella euglypha
 †Strophostylus
 †Strophostylus globosus – or unidentified comparable form
  †Taeniocrada
 †Tholisporites
 †Thursophyton
 †Tritoechia
 †Trochonemella
 †Trochonemella churkini – or unidentified related form
 †Tropidodiscus
 †Tropidodiscus minimus
 †Tropidodiscus obex

Mesozoic
The Paleobiology Database records no known occurrences of Mesozoic fossils in Maine.

Cenozoic
This list of the Cenozoic life of Maine contains the various prehistoric life-forms whose fossilized remains have been reported from within the US state of Maine and are from 66 million years of age to geologically recent.

 Astarte
 †Astarte borealis
 †Astarte castanea
 †Astarte elliptica
 †Astarte montagui
 †Astarte sulcata
  Bison
 Buccinum
 †Buccinum cyaneum
 †Buccinum glaciale
 †Buccinum polare
 †Buccinum scalariforme
  †Buccinum undatum
 Chlamys
 †Chlamys islandica
 Ciliatocardium
 †Ciliatocardium ciliatum
 Colus
 †Colus stimpsoni
 Cryptonatica
 †Cryptonatica affinis
 Ennucula
 †Ennucula tenuis
 Ensis
 †Ensis directus
 Erignathus
  †Erignathus barbatus
 Euspira
 †Euspira pallida
 Goethemia
 †Goethemia pinnulata
 Hemimactra
 †Hemimactra solidissima
 Hiatella
  †Hiatella arctica
 †Hiatella distorta
 Lyonsia
 †Lyonsia arenosa
 Macoma
 †Macoma balthica
 †Macoma calcarea
 †Macoma groenlandica
 †Macoma subulosa
 Mactromeris
 †Mactromeris polynyma
  †Mammuthus
 Margarites
 †Margarites striatus
 Mesodesma
 †Mesodesma arctatum
 Musculus
 †Musculus discors
 †Musculus glacialis
 †Musculus niger
 †Mya
 †Mya arenaria
  †Mya truncata
  Mytilus
 †Mytilus edulis
 Neptunea
  †Neptunea despecta
 †Neptunea lyrata
 Nucella
 †Nucella lapillus
 Nucula
 †Nucula antiqua
 †Nucula proxima
 Nuculana
 †Nuculana pernula
 †Nuculana tenuisulcata
 Odobenus
  †Odobenus rosmarus
 Pagophilus
 †Pagophilus groenlandica
 Pandora
 †Pandora arctica
 †Pandora glacialis
 †Pandora trilineata
 Placopecten
  †Placopecten magellanicus
 Portlandia
 †Portlandia arctica
 †Portlandia glacialis
 Puncturella
 †Puncturella noachina
 Saccella
 †Saccella pernula
 Serripes
 †Serripes groenlandicus
 Similipecten
 †Similipecten greenlandicus
  Tectonatica
 †Tectonatica pusilla
 Thracia
 †Thracia conradi
 †Thracia septentrionalis
 Thyasira
 †Thyasira gouldii
  Uria
 †Uria affinis – type locality for species
 Yoldia
 †Yoldia myalis
 Yoldiella
 †Yoldiella lenticula
 Zirfaea
 †Zirfaea crispata

References
 

Maine
Maine-related lists